Charles A. Wedemeyer (1911–1999) was a pioneer in the field of independent and distance learning. He challenged university administrators to expand access and opportunity to autonomous learners. "Educational change is evolutionary, and its tempo is glacial," he wrote.

Early years

Born in Milwaukee, Wisconsin, in 1911, to parents of modest means, Charles Wedemeyer developed a sense of excitement for what he described as “self-initiated” learning. His parents, Adrian August Wedemeyer and Laura Marie Marks Wedemeyer strived to provide books and magazines and an environment conducive to learning. An avid reader, the young Wedemeyer made great use of his local library in his quest for knowledge.[2] He received a Bachelor of Science degree in Education with a major in English, later pursuing a master's degree in English, both from the University of Wisconsin–Madison and Northwestern University. As a young educator, he taught English and Science to disadvantaged youth. It was at that time that he began to formulate his progressive ideas on extending educational opportunities as integral to the democratic project.

Career

1954-1964
Wedemeyer considered that "independent study in the American context is generic for a range of teaching-learning activities that sometimes go by separate names (correspondence study, open education, radio-television teaching, individualised learning)."

A lifelong advocate for independent learning, his best known project was the Articulated Instructional Media (AIM) initiative, which proved influential in the establishment of Britain’s Open University, now known as the UK Open University.

Notes

References
 Keegan, D. (1990). Foundations of Distance Education. New York: Routledge.
 Watkins, B. L., & Wright, S. J. (Eds.)(1991). The Foundations of American Distance Education: A Century of Collegiate Correspondence Study. Dubuque, Iowa: Kendall/Hunt.
 Wedemeyer, C. A. (1981). Learning at the Back Door: Reflections on Non-Traditional Learning in the Lifespan. Madison, Wis.: University of Wisconsin Press.

Further reading
 Burton, Gera (2010). "Opening the Great Gate at “the Palace of Learning”: Charles A. Wedemeyer’s Pioneering Role as Champion of the Independent Learner". Vitae Scholasticae vol. 27, no. 1.
 Mackenzie, O. & Christensen, E. L. (Eds.)(1971). The Changing World of Correspondence Study: International Readings. University Park: Pennsylvania State University Press, 1971.
 Moore, M. G. & Shin, N. (Eds.).(2000). '"Charles Wedemeyer: The Father of Distance Education" in  Michael G. Moore and Namin Shin (Eds.), Speaking Personally about Distance Education: Foundations of Contemporary Practice. University Park, PA: Pennsylvania State University Press.
 Wedemeyer, C. A., & Childs, G.B. (1961). New Perspectives in University Correspondence Study. Chicago: Center for the Study of Liberal Education for Adults.

1911 births
1999 deaths
Writers from Milwaukee
Educators from Wisconsin